Abdullah Mubarak Al-Refai (Arabic: الدكتور عبدالله مبارك الرفاعي), (b. 4 Nov. 1937 – d.27 Dec. 2005) was born in Kuwait. Al-Refai became President of Gulf University for Science and Technology on 1 December 2003. Prior to GUST, Al-Refai was the President of the Arabian Gulf University in Bahrain. 

1937 births
2005 deaths
Fellows of the Royal College of Physicians
Academic staff of Kuwait University
Academic staff of the Arabian Gulf University
Alumni of the University of Liverpool
Academic staff of the Gulf University for Science and Technology